Mariam Chabi Talata Zimé Yérima (born 7 July 1963),  is a Beninese politician who is the current Vice President of Benin after being elected in the 2021 Beninese presidential election as the running mate of President Patrice Talon. She was sworn in on 24 May 2021.

Mariam Talata, is Benin’s first female vice-president. The former teacher and school inspector is one of a small but growing number of women reaching higher office across sub-Saharan Africa.

She is a former professor of philosophy and former Vice President of the National Assembly of Benin.

She is a founding member of the Progressive Union party. She has been described as a 'feminist' and has campaigned on legalising abortion and on women's education.

References

1963 births
Living people
Vice presidents of Benin
Members of the National Assembly (Benin)
21st-century Beninese politicians
Women vice presidents
21st-century women politicians
Progressive Union (Benin) politicians
Beninese women